Norman Henry Price II (born August 25, 1994) is a gridiron football offensive guard for the San Antonio Brahmas of the XFL. He played college football at Southern Mississippi.

Early years
Price was born to Charlotte and Norman Price. Price graduated from Vicksburg High School where he played football and basketball.

College career
Price started his college career at Hinds Community College. Price helped Hinds record 1,428 yards passing and 2,178 yards rushing for 3,606 total yards in 9 games as Freshman in 2012. In 2013,he helped Hinds to a 7-3 record and a berth in the Brazos Valley Bowl. Hinds totaled 421.6 yards per game average which was good for No. 16 nationally in the NJCAA, while the Eagles also finished No. 11 in the nation in rushing yards with 2,337. Price earned All-State honors and First-team All-Region 23. In 2014, his first year with Southern Miss, Price played in nine games on the season, making six starts. He made his NCAA Division I debut with first Division I start in the season opener on the road at Mississippi State. Earned a start against Appalachian State. Helped the team rush for 1,149 yards, while passing for an additional 3,231 for a total offensive production of 4,380. Price majored in communications.

Professional career

San Francisco 49ers
On May 6, 2016, the San Francisco 49ers signed Price as an undrafted free agent. He was waived on September 3, 2016 and was signed to the practice squad the next day. After spending his entire rookie season on the practice squad, Price signed a reserve/future contract with the 49ers on January 3, 2017.

On September 1, 2017, Price was waived by the 49ers.

Jacksonville Jaguars
On October 13, 2017, Price was signed to the Jacksonville Jaguars' practice squad. He was released on October 24, 2017.

First stint with Panthers
On June 4, 2018, Price signed with the Carolina Panthers. He was waived on August 31, 2018.

Calgary Stampeders
Price signed with the Calgary Stampeders of the Canadian Football League on March 18, 2019. He was released on April 18.

Second stint with Panthers
Price re-signed with the Carolina Panthers on July 24, 2019. He was placed on injured reserve on August 19, 2019. He was released on August 28, 2019.

Toronto Argonauts
Price signed with the Toronto Argonauts of the CFL on March 2, 2020. He signed a contract extension with the team on December 18, 2020. He was released on May 18, 2021.

San Antonio Brahmas 
On November 17, 2022, Price was drafted by the San Antonio Brahmas of the XFL.

References

Living people
1994 births
Players of American football from Mississippi
Sportspeople from Vicksburg, Mississippi
American football offensive guards
Southern Miss Golden Eagles football players
San Francisco 49ers players
Jacksonville Jaguars players
Carolina Panthers players
Calgary Stampeders players
Toronto Argonauts players
San Antonio Brahmas players